Seth Greenland (born July 22, 1955) is an American novelist, playwright and screenwriter. Greenland currently co-hosts the Los Angeles Review of Books Radio Hour, a show about literary culture that airs on KPFK, 90.7 FM in Los Angeles.

Early life and education 
Seth Greenland was born in New York City and grew up in Scarsdale, N.Y. He is the son of Leo Greenland, CEO of Smith/Greenland Advertising, and Rita Greenland, an advertising executive. He has a younger brother. Greenland graduated from Scarsdale High School, received a BA from Connecticut College and an MFA at NYU.

While in graduate school Greenland contributed to the SoHo Weekly News, Andy Warhol's Interview Magazine, and wrote a piece for Parade Magazine about the emerging comedy scene of the late 1970s. Before becoming a full-time writer he worked as a construction worker, lobster fisherman, and in the early 1980s, sold cable television subscriptions door-to- door in Los Angeles.

Career 
After college, Greenland first worked as a copyboy at the New York Daily News. He later worked on several projects with comedian Richard Belzer, sold jokes to Joan Rivers and wrote a spec television script that came to the attention of Norman Lear who hired him to work on the ABC series AKA Pablo, a sitcom about an Hispanic family starring Paul Rodriguez.

Greenland subsequently moved back to New York from Los Angeles, where he began to write screenplays and plays. In the early 90s, he co-wrote (with Larry David) and directed a short film called The Dairy Lobbyist starring Larry David that aired on VH-1. In 1995, Greenland wrote the screenplay for the New Line hip-hop comedy, Who's The Man?, starring Dr. Dre and Ed Lover and directed by Ted Demme. By 2003, he had returned to television writing as a writer-producer for the final season on the HBO comedy Arli$$, and for two seasons on the HBO drama Big Love.

Greenland's first produced play was Girls in Movies (1987). Six years later, he received a Kennedy Center/American Express Fund For New American Plays Award and production grant for his second play, Jungle Rot (1994). The play is about a CIA plot to assassinate the Congolese president, Patrice Lumumba, based on the CIA station chief posted in the Congo in 1960 Larry Devlin. Jungle Rot won an American Theater Critics Association Award (1996). Greenland went on to write two more plays, Red Memories (1996) and Jerusalem (2001).

In 2005, Greenland published his first novel, The Bones, which the LA Times called "a remarkable debut." His next book, Shining City, was named as a Washington Post Best Book of 2008. Greenland published his third novel, The Angry Buddhist, in 2012. The New York Times called his most recent novel from 2015, I Regret Everything, "affecting and funny." All four novels have been published in France.

Personal life 
He lives in Los Angeles with his wife, the author and mindfulness teacher Susan Kaiser Greenland. They have two grown children.

Works

Novels 
 The Bones (2005)
 Shining City (2008)
 The Angry Buddhist (2012)
 I Regret Everything (2015)
 The Hazards of Good Fortune (2018)

Plays 
 Girls In Movies (1987)
 Jungle Rot (1994)
 Red Memories (1996)
 Jerusalem (2001)

TV/film 
 Big Love (2010-2011)
 Arli$$ (2003)
 Who's the Man? (1996)

Anthologies 
 Best Plays of 1995-1996
 The Devil's Punchbowl (2010)
 Cape Cod Noir (2011)
 Yes Is The Answer (2013)

Recognition 
 Kennedy Center/American Express Fund For New American Plays Award (1993)
 American Theater Critics Association Award (1996)

References

External links 
 
 

American television writers
American male television writers
American television producers
Living people
Place of birth missing (living people)
Connecticut College alumni
Tisch School of the Arts alumni
1955 births